The Großer Muntanitz (3,232m) is the highest mountain in the Granatspitze Group, located between the Venediger Group and the Glockner Group in the High Tauern, Austria.

The mountain is close to Matrei in Osttirol and Kals am Großglockner in Tyrol, and climbs usually start from either village. The summit offers fine views of both Großglockner and Großvenediger.

References

Mountains of Tyrol (state)
Mountains of the Alps
Granatspitze Group
Alpine three-thousanders